The Permanent Joint Headquarters (PJHQ) is the British tri-service headquarters from where all overseas military operations are planned and controlled. It is situated at Northwood Headquarters in Northwood, London. The Permanent Joint Headquarters is commanded by the Chief of Joint Operations (CJO), the position of which is currently held by Lieutenant General Charles Stickland.

History 
Major General Christopher Wallace led the team that began establishing the headquarters from 1994. "Senior officers in the Army and RAF did not welcome this initiative and Wallace had to deploy his considerable skills of advocacy to win that battle" (to establish the new joint headquarters).

The Permanent Joint Headquarters was established on 1 April 1996 to enhance the operational effectiveness and efficiency of UK-led joint, potentially joint and multi-national operations, and to exercise operational command of UK forces assigned to multinational operations led by others. Wallace was appointed as CJO in the rank of lieutenant general. The PJHQ started to assume responsibility for military operations worldwide (fully operational) on 1 August 1996. The 35-hectare Northwood Headquarters site has belonged to the RAF since 1938.

By mid-1998, a short-notice deployable headquarters commanded by a Brigadier-equivalent officer, the Joint Force Headquarters (JFHQ) was being established within PJHQ. The JFHQ was an outgrowth of the PJHQ's J3 Operations staff. The JFHQ was described as 'capable of deploying into the field at very short notice,' by its first commander, Brigadier David Richards. Richards was appointed as Chief Joint Rapid Deployment Force Operations, and also to expand the concept that underpinned its creation, the Joint Rapid Reaction Forces. The JRRFs were to be "a pool of highly capable force elements, maintained at high and very high readiness," from which the UK was to meet all short notice contingencies. Initially planned to have a staff of 24, Richards expanded the JFHQ to 55 strong, 'something our training and experience on exercise was proving necessary.'

In 2007-2008, the PJHQ' s budget was estimated around £475 million.

In 2010, the PJHQ and its 600 staff officers and enlisted personnel moved to a contemporary building in Northwood, London. For the first time, all PJHQ staff were gathered under the same roof.

Among the operations supervised by PJHQ have been Operation Veritas (Afghanistan, 2001); Operation Telic (2003 invasion of Iraq); Operation Herrick (UK operations in Helmand Province, Afghanistan, from 2006); and Operation Pitting (evacuation of UK nationals and at-risk Afghanistanis from Kabul in 2021).

Mission and duties 
The PJHQ's mission is as follows:

PJHQ operates cyber operations in coordination with the Government Communications Headquarters in Cheltenham.

There are certain areas that the headquarters will not be involved in:
 Strategic Nuclear Deterrent
 Defence of the UK Home Base, Territorial Waters and Airspace
 Northern Ireland
 Counter-terrorism in UK (Home Office)
 NATO Article V (General War) (NATO Military Command Structure)
As of November 2022, there were 567 military and civil service personnel assigned to PJHQ.

Commanders 
The Chief of Joint Operations (CJO) is the appointment held by the three star ranked officer that leads PJHQ.

See also 

 Northwood Headquarters

References 

Vice Admiral Sir Ian Garnett, "My Job: The Challenge of Joint Command," RUSI Journal, August 1999
Vice Admiral Sir Ian Garnett, "PJHQ: The Heart of UK Defence Capability," RUSI Journal, April 2000

External links 
 

Buildings and structures in Three Rivers District
Joint military units and formations of the United Kingdom
Military headquarters in the United Kingdom
Military installations in England
Military units and formations established in 1996
Military units and formations in Hertfordshire
Military history of London
UK